Amsoft was a wholly owned subsidiary of Amstrad, PLC, founded in 1984 and re-integrated with its parent company in 1989. Its purpose was to provide an initial infrastructure of software and services for users of Amstrad's range of home computers, the Amstrad CPC and, from 1986, the ZX Spectrum. Many people's first contact with software on an Amstrad home computer would have been an Amsoft title, as several titles were included in the sales bundles.

History
While developing its first home computer, the Amstrad CPC464, Amstrad assessed that part of the success of its competitors' machines was the backing of a grown infrastructure of software and services. Being a newcomer to the computer market, Amstrad decided to artificially create this infrastructure for the launch of their own computers. In February 1984, Amstrad founded its Amsoft division headed by Roland Perry and William Poel who at the time were also overseeing the development of the Amstrad CPC464 itself.

Most prominently, Amsoft acted as the first-party game and business software publisher for Amstrad computers. Most of its software products were licensed from various third-party developers and published under the Amsoft label. This also provided a risk-free means for established software studios to try out their products in the emerging Amstrad CPC market. In addition to publishing software, Amsoft was tasked with press relations and consumer promotion, most notably creating and maintaining the Amstrad User Club and publishing its periodical, the CPC464 User (later Amstrad Computer User).

When a reliable third-party support had been established, Amsoft gradually faded out the publishing of software and sold the Amstrad User Club as well as the user magazine. By 1989, Amsoft was fully integrated with the main Amstrad corporation and ceased to exist as a separate entity.

Games

1984
 American Football
 Astro Attack
 Blagger
 Bridge-It
 Electro Freddy
 Fruit Machine
 The Galactic Plague
 Harrier Attack
 Haunted Hedges
 Hunchback
 Laserwarp
 Mr Wong's Loopy Laundry
 Mutant Monty
 Oh Mummy
 Punchy
 Quack-a-Jack
 Roland Ahoy
 Roland on the Ropes
 Roland in the Caves
 Roland Goes Digging
 Roland Goes Square Bashing
 Roland on the Run
 Spannerman
 Space Hawks
 Sultan's Maze
 Pyjamarama
 Detective
 Xanagrams
 Animal Vegetable Mineral
 Happy Letters
 Map Rally
 Timeman One / L'Horloger 1
 Wordhang
 Fruit Machine
 Amsgolf
 Codename MAT
 Hunter Killer
 Snooker
 L'Ardoise Magique
 Les Chiffres Magiques
 Le Géographe - France
 Le Géographe - Monde
 L'Horloger 2 / Timeman Two
 Les Lettres Magiques
 Osprey!
 Star Watcher
 Admiral Graf Spee

1985
 3D Grand Prix
 Jet-Boot Jack
 Airwolf
 Assault on Port Stanley
 Doors of Doom
 Dragon's Gold
 Frank 'n' Stein
 Friss Man
 Fu-Kung in Las Vegas
 The Game of Dragons
 The Key Factor
 Manic Miner
 The Prize
 Roland in Time
 Roland in Space
 Seesaw
 Super Pipeline 2
 Supertripper
 Sorcery Plus
 Cyrus 2 Chess
 Masterchess
 Happy Numbers
 Stockmarket
 Traffic
 3D Boxing
 3D Stunt Rider
 Alex Higgins World Pool
 Alex Higgins' World Snooker
 Glen Hoddle Soccer
 Rock Hopper
 Strangeloop Plus
 Subterranean Stryker
 Tombstowne
 Kingdoms
 Braxx Bluff
 Overlord 2
 Campeones
 Classic Racing
 L'Apprenti Sorcier
 Satellite Warrior

1986
 Qabbalah
 Happy Writing
 Nuclear Defence
 Golden Path
 6128 Games Collection

1987–1989
 Scalextric (1987)
 Tank Command (1988)
 Fantastic Voyage (1989)

References

Amstrad CPC
ZX Spectrum
Video game publishers
Video game companies established in 1984
Video game companies disestablished in 1989
Defunct video game companies of the United Kingdom